Martina Navratilova was the defending champion and won in the final 6–3, 6–2 against Andrea Jaeger.

Seeds
A champion seed is indicated in bold text while text in italics indicates the round in which that seed was eliminated.

  Martina Navratilova (champion)
  Andrea Jaeger (final)
  Tracy Austin (semifinals)
  Pam Shriver (semifinals)
  Mima Jaušovec (first round)
  Wendy Turnbull (quarterfinals)
  Sylvia Hanika (second round)
  Bettina Bunge (quarterfinals)

Draw

External links
 1983 Virginia Slims of Chicago Draw

Ameritech Cup
1983 Virginia Slims World Championship Series